Acefurtiamine (INN) is a vitamin B1 analog in a manner similar to the GABAergic activity of the thiamine derivative clomethiazole.  It functions as an analgesic agent at sufficient doses.

References

Analgesics
Acetate esters
2-Furyl compounds
Thioesters
Pyrimidines
Thiamine
Formamides